Zambezi Airport  is an airport serving the town of Zambezi in the Northwestern Province of Zambia. The airport is within the town, and just east of the Zambezi River.

The Zambezi non-directional beacon (Ident: ZB) is located on the field.

See also

Transport in Zambia
List of airports in Zambia

References

External links
FallingRain - Zambezi Airport
OpenStreetMap - Zambezi

 OurAirports - Zambezi Airport

Airports in Zambia
Buildings and structures in North-Western Province, Zambia